James Leroy O'Gwynn (January 26, 1928 – January 19, 2011) was an American country music singer. Between 1958 and 1962, he recorded for the D and Mercury labels, charting six times on the Hot Country Songs charts. His work on the D label was produced by Pappy Daily, best known for producing George Jones.

O'Gwynn's highest-peaking single came during his Mercury career, when he reached No. 7 with "My Name Is Mud." None of his other singles afterward made the charts, and he moved among several labels, including United Artists Records and Plantation Records.

Singles

References

1928 births
2011 deaths
American country singer-songwriters
Mercury Records artists
Singer-songwriters from Mississippi
Country musicians from Mississippi